The International Maritime Bureau is a specialized department of the International Chamber of Commerce.

The IMB's responsibilities lie in fighting crimes related to maritime trade and transportation, particularly piracy and commercial fraud, and in protecting the crews of ocean-going vessels.
It publishes a weekly piracy report and maintains a 24-hour piracy reporting centre in Kuala Lumpur, Malaysia.

The IMB is part of ICC Commercial Crime Services whose other divisions include The Counterfeiting Intelligence Bureau, The Financial Investigation Bureau and FraudNet.

FraudNet is the world's leading network of fraud and asset recovery lawyers with 63 lawyers in 56 different jurisdictions.

The bureau, endorsed by the UN's International Maritime Organisation, was founded in 1981. The body has observer status with Interpol and a MOU with the World Customs Organization.

Its present director is Captain Pottengal Mukundan.

Notes

External links
 International Maritime Bureau website
 IMB Piracy Reporting Centre, including a live piracy update
	

Maritime organizations